Cyclamen creticum, commonly known as Cretan sowbread, is a small perennial herb endemic to Crete and Karpathos. It is closely related to Cyclamen repandum, and both are placed in subgenus Psilanthum. Some authorities consider C. creticum to be a subspecies of C. repandum.

Etymology 
The name of the subgenus, Psilanthum, comes from Ancient Greek: psilós "bare" and ánthos "flower".

Description

 

It is a long-lived perennial herb with a tuberous rootstock. They tend to grow on rocky places, stream and river banks, gullies, or under bushes. Can be described as a tender plant; prefers to grow in the shade protected from the sun.

Leaf - Heart-shaped, cordate leaves, often coarsely toothed, of dark-green color with a red-purple back. Cloudy or netted silvery markings can be seen on the leaf.

Flower - Within the same species, C. creticum flowers come in two distinguished forms: Forma creticum and Forma pallide-roseum. 
Forma creticum flowers are completely white. 
Forma pallide-roseum flowers are white to light 
pink with an hints of pale pink infused.

In its habitat, there is no true demarcation of these two forms. Forma creticum is by far the more common form. The flowers are hermaphroditic and solitary (not part of an inflorescence). Strongly fragrant but produces no nectar. The corolla is formed by five petals, which are long and slender with an absence of auricles. Flowers bloom around April to May.

Stalk - The stalk is long, thin, and red.

Distribution
Cyclamen creticum is endemic to the Greek Islands of Crete and Karpathos. 
It is known to grow on two locations in Karpathos whereas it is abundantly found all over Crete, growing at sea level to 1300m.

Reproduction 
Cyclamen creticum rarely self-fertilizes due to approach herkogamy, where the stigma is above the level of the anthers. Insect pollinators of C. creticum include hoverflies and bumblebees.

References

External links
The Cyclamen Society: Cyclamen creticum Hildebrand 

IPNI Listing: Cyclamen creticum
Kew Plant List: Cyclamen creticum

creticum